Elena Suslova is a former Russian football defender, who played for Zvezda Perm in the Russian Championship. She has won 5 championships with Energiya Voronezh and Zvezda.

She has been a member of the Russian national team, but missed the 2009 European Championship due to an injury. She played during the 2009 European Championship qualification.

Titles
 5 Russian Leagues (2002, 2003, 2007, 2008, 2009)
 2 Russian Cups (2001, 2007)

References

1984 births
Living people
Russian women's footballers
Russia women's international footballers
FC Energy Voronezh players
Ryazan-VDV players
Zvezda 2005 Perm players
Women's association football defenders